The Long March was a massive military retreat undertaken in 1934 by the Red Armies of the Chinese Communist Party.

Long March may also refer to:

Military actions and prisoner of war marches
 Long Walk of the Navajo, the 1864 forced march of the Navajo people from their homelands in Arizona and New Mexico to an internment camp at Fort Sumner in New Mexico
 Little Long March, the failed retreat in 1927 by Left-KMT Northern Expedition troops from Nanchang to Guangzhou
 Partisan Long March, the military retreat of the Yugoslav Partisans across Bosnia in 1942
 The March (1945), also known as the Long March, westward marches by groups of Allied POWs from German camps during the final stages of World War II in Europe
 2014 retreat from Western Bahr el Ghazal, also called the "long march north", an unorganized withdrawal of Sudan People's Liberation Army deserters during the South Sudanese Civil War

Entertainment

Film
Darah dan Doa (1950), also known as The Long March, a film by Usmar Ismail
"The Long March" (American Dad!), an episode of the American animated sitcom American Dad!

Literature
 The Long March (novel) (1956), a novel by William Styron
 The Long March (1957), a book by Simone de Beauvoir

Music
 The Long March (album), a 1979 album by Max Roach and Archie Sheep
 The Long March EP (2005), a Blue Scholars release
 A Long March: The First Recordings, a 2006 album by As I Lay Dying

Other uses
 Long March (Pakistan), a January 2013 public protest against alleged governmental corruption
 Long March (rocket family), any rocket in a family of expendable launch systems operated by the China National Space Administration
 Long march through the institutions, a slogan for socialist strategy in West Germany coined by Rudi Dutschke around 1967

See also
Death march (disambiguation)
Long March for Justice, Freedom and Hope, 1988 protest march against the Australian Bicentenary
The Long Run (disambiguation)
Long Walk (disambiguation)